Chrissie Clare Venn (25 July 1907 – 26 February 1921) was a 13-year-old Australian girl whose murder outside the village of North Motton near Ulverstone, Tasmania, remains unsolved.

The murder
Venn was the daughter of George Arthur and Eva May (née Chilcott) Venn. 

Most sources state – and it is generally accepted – that at approximately 5 p.m. on 20 February 1921, Venn left the family home on Allison Road to run some errands in the village of North Motton – a distance of approximately three miles – and never returned home. A search was mounted but it was not until the morning of March 1 that her mutilated body was found in a hollow tree stump located close to the road where she would have travelled as she walked to North Motton.

Another source gives differing details: The murder purportedly occurred on 26 February 1921. The body was not mutilated and Venn had either been suffocated or strangled. George William King was tried for the crime in a trial that commenced 2 August 1921. The trial had been moved from the North West Coast of Tasmania to Hobart, the first change of venue ever requested and approved for a trial in Tasmania. George William King was defended by Albert Ogilvie, who went on to become Premier of Tasmania. King was acquitted of the murder.

George William King
King had been a member of the search party. He became a suspect in Venn's murder due to marks on his hands that he ascribed to an accident during the search for Venn. King, a 35-year-old former miner and policeman, was arrested on 8 March and charged with her murder. King's trial started in Hobart during June and on 11 August he was acquitted.

Burial and ghost
Venn was interred at the North Motton Methodist Cemetery. Her ghost is claimed to haunt the area of her murder.

See also
List of solved missing persons cases
List of unsolved murders

References

Bibliography

External links

1920s missing person cases
1921 murders in Australia
Deaths by person in Australia
Female murder victims
Formerly missing people
Incidents of violence against girls
Missing person cases in Australia
Murder in Tasmania
Unsolved murders in Australia